The Mughal emperors were the supreme heads of state of the Mughal Empire on the Indian subcontinent, mainly corresponding to the modern countries of India, Pakistan, Afghanistan and Bangladesh. The Mughal rulers styled themselves as Badshah (great king) or Shahanshah, a title usually translated from Persian as "emperor". They began to rule parts of India from 1526, and by 1707 ruled most of the sub-continent. After that they declined rapidly, but nominally ruled territories until the Indian Rebellion of 1857.

The Mughals were a branch of the Timurid dynasty of Turco-Mongol origin from Central Asia. Their founder Babur, a Timurid prince from the Fergana Valley (modern-day Uzbekistan), was a direct descendant of Timur (generally known in western nations as Tamerlane) and also affiliated with Genghis Khan through Timur's marriage to a Genghisid princess.

Many of the later Mughal emperors had significant Indian Rajput and Persian ancestry through marriage alliances as emperors were born to Rajput and Persian princesses. Akbar, for instance, was half-Persian (his mother was of Persian origin), Jahangir was half-Rajput and quarter-Persian, and Shah Jahan was three-quarters Rajput.

During the reign of Aurangzeb, the empire, as the world's largest economy and manufacturing power, worth over 25% of global GDP, controlled nearly all of the Indian subcontinent, extending from Chittagong in the east to Kabul and Balochistan in the west, Kashmir in the north to the Kaveri River basin in the south. 

Its population at the time has been estimated as between 110 and 150 million (a quarter of the world's population), over a territory of more than 4 million square kilometres (1.5 million square miles). Mughal power rapidly dwindled during the 18th century and the last emperor, Bahadur Shah II, was deposed in 1857, with the establishment of the British Raj.

Mughal Empire

The Mughal empire was founded by Babur, a Timurid prince and ruler from Central Asia. Babur was a direct descendant of the Timurid Emperor Tamerlane on his father's side, and the Mongol ruler Genghis Khan on his mother's side. Ousted from his ancestral domains in Turkistan by Sheybani Khan, the 40-year-old Prince Babur turned to India to satisfy his ambitions. He established himself in Kabul and then pushed steadily southward into India from Afghanistan through the Khyber Pass. Babur's forces occupied much of northern India after his victory at Panipat in 1526. The preoccupation with wars and military campaigns, however, did not allow the new emperor to consolidate the gains he had made in India. The instability of the empire became evident under his son, Humayun, who was driven into exile in Persia by rebels. Humayun's exile in Persia established diplomatic ties between the Safavid and Mughal Courts and led to increasing West Asian cultural influence in the Mughal court. The restoration of Mughal rule began after Humayun's triumphant return from Persia in 1555, but he died from an accident shortly afterwards. Humayun's son, Akbar, succeeded to the throne under a regent, Bairam Khan, who helped consolidate the Mughal Empire in India.

Through warfare and diplomacy, Akbar was able to extend the empire in all directions and controlled almost the entire Indian subcontinent north of the Godavari river. He created a new ruling elite loyal to him, implemented a modern administration, and encouraged cultural developments. He increased trade with European trading companies. The Indian historian Abraham Eraly wrote that foreigners were often impressed by the fabulous wealth of the Mughal court, but the glittering court hid darker realities, namely that about a quarter of the empire's gross national product was owned by 655 families while the bulk of India's 120  million people lived in appalling poverty. After suffering what appears to have been an epileptic seizure in 1578 while hunting tigers, which he regarded as a religious experience, Akbar grew disenchanted with Islam, and came to embrace a syncretistic mixture of Hinduism and Islam. Akbar allowed freedom of religion at his court and attempted to resolve socio-political and cultural differences in his empire by establishing a new religion, Din-i-Ilahi, with strong characteristics of a ruler cult. He left his son an internally stable state, which was in the midst of its golden age, but before long signs of political weakness would emerge.

Akbar's son, Jahangir, "was addicted to opium, neglected the affairs of the state, and came under the influence of rival court cliques. During the reign of Jahangir's son, Shah Jahan, the splendour of the Mughal court reached its peak, as exemplified by the Taj Mahal. The cost of maintaining the court, however, began to exceed the revenue coming in.

Shah Jahan's eldest son, the liberal Dara Shikoh, became regent in 1658, as a result of his father's illness. Dara championed a syncretistic Hindu-Muslim religion and culture. With the support of the Islamic orthodoxy, however, a younger son of Shah Jahan, Aurangzeb, seized the throne. Aurangzeb defeated Dara in 1659 and had him executed. Although Shah Jahan fully recovered from his illness, there was a succession war for the throne between Dara and Aurangzeb. Finally, Aurangzeb succeeded the throne and kept Shah Jahan under house arrest.

During Aurangzeb's reign, the empire gained political strength once more, and it became the world's largest economy, over a quarter of the world GDP, but his establishment of Sharia caused huge controversies. Aurangzeb expanded the empire to include a huge part of South Asia. At its peak, the kingdom stretched to 3.2 million square kilometres, including parts of what are now India, Pakistan, Afghanistan and Bangladesh. After his death in 1707, "many parts of the empire were in open revolt". Aurangzeb's attempts to reconquer his family's ancestral lands in Central Asia were not successful while his successful conquest of the Deccan region proved to be a Pyrrhic victory that cost the empire heavily in both blood and treasure. A further problem for Aurangzeb was the army had always been based upon the land-owning aristocracy of northern India who provided the cavalry for the campaigns, and the empire had nothing equivalent to the Janissary corps of the Ottoman Empire. The long and costly conquest of the Deccan had badly diminished the "aura of success" that surrounded Aurangzeb, and from the late 17th century onwards, the aristocracy became increasingly unwilling to provide forces for the empire's wars as the prospect of being rewarded with land as a result of a successful war was seen as less and less likely.

Furthermore, at the conclusion of the conquest of the Deccan, Aurangzeb had very selectively rewarded some of the noble families with confiscated land in the Deccan, leaving aristocrats unrewarded with confiscated land feeling strongly disgruntled and unwilling to participate in further campaigns. Aurangzeb's son, Shah Alam, repealed the religious policies of his father and attempted to reform the administration. "However, after his death in 1712, the Mughal dynasty sank into chaos and violent feuds. In the year 1719 alone, four emperors successively ascended the throne".

During the reign of Muhammad Shah, the empire began to break up, and vast tracts of central India passed from Mughal to Maratha hands. Mughal warfare had always been based upon heavy artillery for sieges, heavy cavalry for offensive operations and light cavalry for skirmishing and raids. To control a region, the Mughals had always sought to occupy a strategic fortress in some region, which would serve as a nodal point from which the Mughal army would emerge to take on any enemy that challenged the empire. This system was not only expensive but also made the army somewhat inflexible as the assumption was always the enemy would retreat into a fortress to be besieged or would engage in a set-piece decisive battle of annihilation on open ground. The Hindu Marathas were expert horsemen who refused to engage in set-piece battles, but rather engaged in campaigns of guerrilla warfare upon the Mughal supply lines. The Marathas were unable to take the Mughal fortresses via a storm or formal siege as they lacked the artillery, but by constantly intercepting supply columns, they were able to starve Mughal fortresses into submission.

Successive Mughal commanders refused to adjust their tactics and develop an appropriate counter-insurgency strategy, which led to the Mughals losing more and more ground to the Maratha. The Indian campaign of Nader Shah of Persia culminated with the Sack of Delhi and shattered the remnants of Mughal power and prestige, as well as capturing the imperial treasury, thus drastically accelerating its decline. Many of the empire's elites now sought to control their own affairs and broke away to form independent kingdoms. The Mughal Emperor, however, continued to be the highest manifestation of sovereignty. Not only the Muslim gentry, but the Maratha, Hindu, and Sikh leaders took part in ceremonial acknowledgements of the emperor as the sovereign of India.

In the next decades, the Afghans, Sikhs, and Marathas battled against each other and the Mughals, revealing the fragmented state of the empire. The Mughal Emperor Shah Alam II made futile attempts to reverse the Mughal decline, but he ultimately had to seek the protection of outside powers. In 1784, the Marathas under Mahadaji Shinde won acknowledgement as the protectors of the emperor in Delhi, a state of affairs that continued until after the Second Anglo-Maratha War. Thereafter, the British East India Company became the protectors of the Mughal dynasty in Delhi. After 1835 the Company no longer recognised the authority of the emperor, accepting him only as 'King of Delhi' and removing all references to him from their coinage. After a crushed rebellion which he nominally led in 1857–58, the last Mughal, Bahadur Shah Zafar, was deposed by the British, who then assumed formal control of a large part of the former empire, marking the start of the British Raj.

Titular Emperors 

Over the course of the Empire, there were several claimants to the Mughal throne who ascended the throne or claimed to do so but were never recognized. 

Here are the claimants to the Mughal throne historians recognise as Titular Mughal Emperors.

 Shahryar Mirza (1627 - 1628)
 Dawar Baksh (1627 - 1628)
Jahangir II (1719 - 1720)

List of Mughal Emperors

Note: The Mughal emperors practiced polygamy. Besides their wives, they also had several concubines in their harem, who produced children. This makes it difficult to identify all the offspring of each emperor.

Family tree of Mughal emperors

See also
 Mughal (disambiguation)
 Timurid family tree
 Mughal Empire
 Mughal-Mongol genealogy

References

Citations

Sources 

 Keay, John, India, a History, 2000, HarperCollins, 
  – India  Pakistan

Further reading

External links
 Aurangzeb, as he was according to Mughal Records
 British India

 
Medieval India

sv:Stormogul#Lista över indiska stormoguler